César Pekelman (20 December 1922 – 1986) is a Brazilian fencer. He competed in the individual and team épée events at the 1952 Summer Olympics.

References

External links
 

1922 births
1986 deaths
Brazilian male épée fencers
Olympic fencers of Brazil
Fencers at the 1952 Summer Olympics